The 1989 National Soccer League First Division was the fifth edition of the NSL First Division in South Africa. It was won by Kaizer Chiefs.

Table

References

NSL First Division seasons